Cherlaksky (masculine), Cherlakskaya (feminine), or Cherlakskoye (neuter) may refer to:
Cherlaksky District, a district of Omsk Oblast, Russia
Cherlakskoye, a rural locality (a selo) in Omsk Oblast, Russia